Unseen is the tenth studio album by The Handsome Family. It was released in September 2016 by the band's own label Milk & Scissors Music, and Loose Music in Europe.

In a departure from recent prior albums, the main duo of Brett and Rennie Sparks were joined by three guest musicians: David Gutierrez (mandolin and dobro), Alex McMahon (guitar, baritone guitar, pedal steel), and Jason Toth (drums).

Reception
The album was well received by critics: according to Metacritic, the album has received an average review score of 81/100, based on 9 reviews, "indicating universal acclaim." Justin Cober-Lake of PopMatters wrote that "Unseen continues the duo's gothic folk and country aesthetic," and noted that the recent high-profile success of the Handsome Family song "Far From Any Road," which was used as the theme song to the TV series True Detective, had not seemed to change the band's approach: "they still sing from the margins, crafting alluring characters and sounds. ... With all its soft unquiet, Unseen stands with the most captivating of the pair's previous work." Joe Goggins of The Line of Best Fit felt that the album did not take enough risks, stating that "it’s on the cuts where there’s signs of progression that Unseen excels, not least because the duo pull them off with real nuance every time."

Track list

References

2016 albums
The Handsome Family albums
Loose Music albums